"The ASEAN Way" is the official anthem of the Association of Southeast Asian Nations (ASEAN). The lyrics were written by Payom Valaiphatchra and the music composed by Kittikhun Sodprasert and Sampow Tri-udom. The anthem was the winning entry out of 99 finalists from all ten ASEAN countries in a competition held in 2008 to establish an official anthem.

ASEAN Anthem Competition 
In 2008, a competition was launched and was announced throughout all the member states of ASEAN in a bid to find an official anthem to replace the formerly de facto regional anthem, ASEAN Hymn, which was considered as lacking in gusto and passion by several member states. The competition was open to all the nationals of ASEAN, limiting to 20 entries per member state. The winning entry received over US$20,000 in reward and was declared as the official regional anthem of Southeast Asia. The panel of judges unanimously voted "The ASEAN Way" as the official regional anthem of the Association of Southeast Asian Nations in the final round on 20 November 2008.

Criteria 
 Language: English
 The anthem should reflect ASEAN dignity, cooperation, and solidarity.
 Should reflect ASEAN's diverse culture and ethnicity
 Should be an original composition
 Must not be longer than 60 seconds

Panel of judges 
 Brunei - Haji Manaf bin Haji Kamis
 Cambodia - Sam Ang Sam
 Indonesia - Purwa Caraka
 Laos - Khamphanh Phonthongsy
 Malaysia - Ayob Ibrahim
 Myanmar (Burma) - Tin Oo Thaung
 Philippines - Apgripino V. Diestro
 Singapore - Phoon Yew Tien
 Thailand - Admiral Mom Luang (The Honourable) Usni Pramoj
 Vietnam - Pham Hong Hai

And three non-ASEAN judges:
 Australia - Sandra Milliken
 China - Bao Yuankai
 Japan - Keiko Harada

Notes

References

External links 
 ASEAN: The ASEAN Way with lyrics by the official channel of the ASEAN secretariat
 About the ASEAN Anthem (archive link)

ASEAN
Asian anthems
Anthems of organizations